Baari is a 2015 Punjabi language Indian short film, directed by Jatinder Preet, a journalist turned filmmaker. Baari had its world premiere at International Film Festival of South Asia in Toronto, Canada in April 2015. It has also been shown at Imagineindia International Film Festival in Madrid, Spain.

Real life farmers and locals from village Changaliwal of Lehragaga in Sangrur district have played different roles in the film highlighting the plight of the widows left behind by the debt-ridden farmers who commit suicide.

Plot 
The story of the film is set in rural Punjab, a province in India known to have been the bread basket of the country, but now facing fallout of severe agrarian crisis. While men are addicted to drugs, women have been forced to look out for sustenance elsewhere. Some women in the village have started going to the nearby towns about whom the villagers make insinuating remarks. It's night and a woman, the central character in the film, who remains unnamed, is unable to sleep. She recounts her recent past from the time she came to that house as a newly-wedded bride. Her first husband, a small-time farmer, committed suicide and she was remarried to her brother in law, Bhola, a cripple and a drug-addict. Failing to cope with mounting debts he too ended his life consuming pesticide. Having watched them die one after the other, she is the one left to look for the rest of the family, consisting of her young daughter and infirm father in law. Spending the whole night awake she finally arrives at a decision. The woman who has so far seen decisions being taken for her by others only, decides to take things in her own hands and fight on. As another day comes up she announces to her father in law that she is going to town. She steps out of her home all prepared to face the challenges of life anew.

Cast 
Raj Dhaliwal as central woman character
Hardarshan as Bhola, her first husband
Jagmel Singh as father-in-law
Navdeep as first husband
Pirthipal as Moneylender
Ashok Garg as moneylender's assistant
Veerpal Kaur as her daughter
Chinto as a woman in the mourning and wedding scenes
Gurmel Khokhar as first man in the mourning scene
Bihari Mander as second man in the mourning scene

Production
This is the debut film of the director Jatinder Preet, also known as Jaypee. The story of the film was developed during his visits with his partner Amrita Chaudhry to Lehragaga, a small town in Punjab that has witnessed a spate of farmer suicides over the past several years. The shooting for the film started in November 2014 and it was completed in four months under the banner Spirit of Amrita Foundation, formed after Chaudhary's death in a road accident in 2012. No professional actors were hired for the project and the film does not follow much of conventional cinematic devices, narrating the story in a very realistic manner. No background music has been used in the narrative with a realistic sound-design.

Notes

External links 

2015 films
Indian short films
Punjabi-language Indian films